Sarah Kathleen Gosling (Nee Webb)  (born 13 January 1977 in Ashford, Surrey) is a British professional sailor and twice Olympic gold medalist.

Sailing career
Webb joined the Royal Yachting Association's youth squad and competed in the Laser Radial class in the ISAF Youth World Championships in 1995 and  1996.

She won a gold medal in the Yngling sailing class in the 2004 Summer Olympics in Athens, Greece, together with Shirley Robertson and Sarah Ayton, collectively nicknamed "Three Blondes in a Boat." She repeated this success in the 2008 Summer Olympics in Beijing, China, together with Pippa Wilson and Sarah Ayton.

In early 2007, Webb appeared on and won BBC cookery programme Ready Steady Cook against fellow Olympic medallist Nick Rogers.

Already a Member of the Order of the British Empire (MBE), she was appointed Officer of the Order of the British Empire (OBE) in the 2009 New Year Honours.

She married multi-millionaire Adam Gosling, a son of the former car park tycoon Sir Donald Gosling in 2009.

References

External links

GB Yngling Team website
Sarah Webb page at Team GB website

1977 births
Living people
English female sailors (sport)
People from Ashford, Surrey
Officers of the Order of the British Empire
English sailors
Yngling class world champions
World champions in sailing for Great Britain
Olympic sailors of Great Britain
English Olympic medallists
Olympic gold medallists for Great Britain
Olympic medalists in sailing
Sailors at the 2004 Summer Olympics – Yngling
Sailors at the 2008 Summer Olympics – Yngling
Medalists at the 2008 Summer Olympics
Medalists at the 2004 Summer Olympics